UFC Fight Night: Belfort vs. Henderson 3 (also known as UFC Fight Night 77) was a mixed martial arts event held on November 7, 2015, at the Ginásio do Ibirapuera in São Paulo, Brazil.

Background
The event was the fourth held in São Paulo following UFC Ultimate Brazil (1998), UFC on FX: Belfort vs. Bisping (2013) and The Ultimate Fighter Brazil 3 Finale: Miocic vs. Maldonado (2014) and the twenty-fourth overall event to be held in Brazil.

The event was headlined by a middleweight trilogy bout between longtime multi-divisional contenders and champions Vitor Belfort and Dan Henderson. Henderson defeated Belfort in their first encounter in 2006 at Pride 32 via unanimous decision. Belfort defeated Henderson in their second encounter in 2013 at UFC Fight Night: Belfort vs. Henderson 2 via first round knockout.

Tom Lawlor was expected to face Fábio Maldonado at this event. However, Lawlor was forced to pull out due to injury and was replaced by The Ultimate Fighter 19 light heavyweight winner Corey Anderson.

On December 4, it was announced that Gleison Tibau was "provisionally suspended" by the United States Anti-Doping Agency (USADA) due to a potential failed out-of-competition drug test. On December 23, a second potential failed drug test, this time in-competition, was also announced. On February 16, Tibau 
announced he will drop his appeal and face the minimum punishment under the new rules, which is a two-year suspension. A day later, Tibau admitted he used erythropoietin out-of-competition thinking it "wouldn’t be anything" and that he thought he wasn't doing something wrong. Subsequently, on February 18, USADA announced Tibau's two-year suspension retroactive to the date of the fight and his win is now overturned to a loss, per the anti-doping policy of the Comissão Atlética Brasileira de MMA (CABMMA), which regulated the bout. Thus, Abel Trujillo's loss was overturned to a win.

Results

Bonus awards
The following fighters were awarded $50,000 bonuses:
Fight of the Night: None awarded
Performance of the Night: Vitor Belfort, Thomas Almeida, Alex Oliveira and Thiago Tavares

See also
List of UFC events
2015 in UFC

References

UFC Fight Night
2015 in mixed martial arts
Mixed martial arts in Brazil
Sport in São Paulo
2015 in Brazilian sport
November 2015 sports events in South America